The voiced palatal lateral fricative is a type of consonantal sound, used in some spoken languages.

Features
Features of the voiced palatal lateral fricative:

Occurrence

See also
Index of phonetics articles

Notes

References

 
 

Lateral consonants
Pulmonic consonants
Voiced oral consonants